Bio is the seventeenth studio album by Chuck Berry, released in 1973 by Chess Records. The backing musicians were Elephants Memory, except on "Rain Eyes" and "Got It and Gone".

Track listing
All tracks composed by Chuck Berry.
 "Bio" – 4:25
 "Hello Little Girl, Goodbye" – 3:56
 "Woodpecker" – 3:33
 "Rain Eyes" – 3:47
 "Aimlessly Driftin'" – 5:42
 "Got It and Gone" – 4:19
 "Talkin' About My Buddy" – 6:56

Personnel
 Chuck Berry – guitar, piano, vocals
Elephants Memory
 Wayne "Tex" Gabriel – guitar
 Gary Van Scyoc – bass
 Adam Ippolito – piano
 Rick Frank – drums
 Stan Bronstein – saxophone
Additional musicians
 Billy Peek – guitar on "Rain Eyes" and "Got It and Gone"
 Greg Edick – bass on "Rain Eyes" and "Got It and Gone"
 Ron Reed – drums on "Rain Eyes" and "Got It and Gone"
Technical
 Esmond Edwards – producer
 Bob Scerbo - production manager
 David Krieger - art direction

Release

 Cassette Bio Universal Special Products	 1995
 CD Bio Universal Distribution / Universal Japan	 2010
 Cassette Bio Chess Special Products

References

External links

Chuck Berry albums
1973 albums
Albums produced by Esmond Edwards
Chess Records albums